The Heath Bar Shake is a milkshake drink sold at Baskin-Robbins, based on the Heath candy bar. It is notable for its high calorie count and was dubbed "The Unhealthiest Drink in America" by Men's Health Magazine. The shake contains 2,310 calories. 

73 different ingredients go into make the shake. The shake was introduced on February 19, 2008 as part of a special limited offer. The shake is mentioned in the book Eat This, Not That.

References

External links
Baskin Robbins Nutritional Information
Products introduced in 2008